Victor Value was a London based value supermarket group that operated at the lower end of the grocery trade. Old Victor Value stores which survived after conversion to Tesco could, for some time, be identified by their distinctive blue and white tiled frontage. Victor Value was often known as VV, which was their logo. The handles on the doors of the store were often shaped to read "VV" when shut.

The Victor Value chain included some former Anthony Jackson Foodfare outlets, which it acquired in the beginning of the 1960s. It was well represented in low income C2D areas, and was also well represented in market areas of London, such as Chapel Market Islington, Church Street Paddington, and Leyton High Road.

In 1968, Victor Value had 217 stores, and was sold to Tesco for £1.75 million. Tesco converted many larger branches to their own brand including some to Tesco Home n' Wear, and closed a number of smaller branches which were in close proximity of an established Tesco store, while those that retained the Victor Value fascia traded at the budget end of the market.

The name Victor Value had disappeared from the high street by the end of the seventies.

At the beginning of the 1980s, some smaller town centre Tesco stores were rebranded as Victor Value. These town centre stores, including ones in Huyton and Bexleyheath, were used to trial new scanning and barcode technologies, before launching them in Tesco branded stores. In 1986, frozen food supermarket chain Bejam purchased the business from Tesco, and rebranded it as Bejam, before Bejam was itself taken over by rival Iceland in January 1989.

References

External links
 A picture of the Church Street store, in its original "Anthony Jackson Supermarket" livery can be viewed at www.churchstreetmemories.org.uk/page/tesco_supermarket

Defunct supermarkets of the United Kingdom
Tesco
Defunct retail companies of the United Kingdom
Retail companies disestablished in 1986
1986 disestablishments in the United Kingdom
20th century in London